Davao del Sur's at-large congressional district is the sole congressional district of the Philippines in the province of Davao del Sur. It was originally created by the 1967 division of the old Davao province and was eliminated following the 1972 abolition of the House of Representatives. The district was restored as a plural member district for the 1984 national parliament known as the Batasang Pambansa but was reconfigured after Davao City gained its own representation. It was eliminated again following the 1987 reapportionment that created an additional district. The district's current configuration dates from 2013 when Davao del Sur lost a seat following the creation of the province of Davao Occidental covering much of its 2nd district. The district is represented in the 18th Congress by Mercedes Cagas of the Nacionalista Party (NP).

Representation history

Election results

2022

2019

2016

2013

2010

See also
Legislative districts of Davao del Sur

References

Congressional districts of the Philippines
Politics of Davao del Sur
1967 establishments in the Philippines
1972 disestablishments in the Philippines
1984 establishments in the Philippines
1986 disestablishments in the Philippines
2016 establishments in the Philippines
At-large congressional districts of the Philippines
Congressional districts of the Davao Region
Constituencies established in 1967
Constituencies disestablished in 1972
Constituencies established in 1984
Constituencies disestablished in 1986
Constituencies established in 2016